"Money on You" may refer to:

 "Money on You" (Chris Blue song), 2017
 "Money on You" (Chad Brownlee song), 2020